III is the third and final studio album released by country music artist Chad Brock. It features the single "Tell Me How". The only single from the album, the song failed to make the top 40 on the US country chart; Brock exited Warner Bros' roster by the end of 2001. Three of Brock's biggest hits — "Yes!", "Ordinary Life" and "Lightning Does the Work", the latter two from his 1998 debut and the former from 2000's Yes! — are included as bonus tracks.

Track listing
"The Thought of Bein' in Love" (Marc Beeson, Jim Collins, Chad Brock) – 3:52
"Park the Pickup (Kiss the Girl)" (Annie Tate, Sam Tate, Dave Berg) – 3:30
"Tell Me How" (Larry Stewart, John Bettis, Jason Deere) – 3:39
"I'd Like to See You Try" (Tom Shapiro, Rick Huckaby) – 3:56
"I Ain't Cryin'" (Beeson, Collins) – 4:03
"The Lie" (Jeff Prince, Steve Stapler, Mike Pyle) – 4:05
"Population Minus One" (Neil Thrasher, Wendell Mobley, Kent Blazy) – 3:56
"Right Now" (Joe Don Rooney, Brett James, Sam Mullins) – 3:57
"I'd Love to Love You" (Craig Wiseman, Collins) – 2:53
"Livin' in Las Vegas" (Sam Hogin, Bob Regan, Phil Barnhart) – 2:55
"Yes!" (Stephony Smith, Collins, Brock) – 3:23
"Ordinary Life" (Connie Harrington, Bonnie Baker) – 3:56
"Lightning Does the Work" (Kelly Garrett, John Hadley, Brock) – 3:45

Personnel

 Eddie Bayers - drums
 David Briggs - piano, synthesizer
 Chad Brock - lead vocals
 Larry Byrom - acoustic guitar
 Buddy Cannon - handclapping
 Melonie Cannon - background vocals
 Jim Chapman - background vocals
 Mike Chapman - bass guitar
 J.T. Corenflos - electric guitar
 Chip Davis - background vocals
 Larry Franklin - fiddle
 Sonny Garrish - steel guitar
 Kevin "Swine" Grantt - bass guitar
 Rob Hajacos - fiddle
 Tim Hensley - banjo
 Wes Hightower - background vocals
 John Hobbs - piano, synthesizer
 Rick Huckaby - background vocals
 Paul Leim - drums, cowbell, tambourine
 B. James Lowry - acoustic guitar, electric guitar, gut string guitar
 Mark Luna - background vocals
 Randy McCormick - keyboards, Hammond organ, synthesizer
 Liana Manis - background vocals
 Dale Oliver - electric guitar
 Larry Paxton - bass guitar
 Gary Prim - piano
 Tom Roady - percussion
 John Wesley Ryles - background vocals
 Stephony Smith - background vocals
 Chalee Tennison - background vocals
 Neil Thrasher - background vocals
 Cindy Richardson-Walker - background vocals
 Biff Watson - acoustic guitar
 Bergen White - background vocals
 John Willis - electric guitar
 Norro Wilson - handclapping
 Curtis Young - background vocals

Chart performance

References

2001 albums
Chad Brock albums
Warner Records albums
Albums produced by Buddy Cannon
Albums produced by Norro Wilson